Liesing is the 23rd district of Vienna. Liesing may also refer to:

 Liesing (Schwechat), a tributary of the Schwechat; also called the Liesingbach
 Liesing (Mur), a left tributary of the Mur; also called the Liesingbach